Wiesław Wraga (born 14 August 1963 in Poland) is a Polish retired footballer.

References

Living people
1963 births
Polish footballers
Association football midfielders
Association football forwards
Widzew Łódź players
Oulun Palloseura players
Oulun Työväen Palloilijat players
People from Stargard